TV/COM International is a company that developed the Compression NetWORKS digital broadcasting system that evolved into the current DVB-S standard for digital satellite broadcasting.  It was used by the short-lived AlphaStar satellite platform for content delivery and conditional access.  TV/COM was formed from the former Oak Communications in San Diego to develop its Compression NetWORKS system. The company was bought by Hyundai in 1994 and became a wholly owned subsidiary of Hyundai. The company was eventually closed and its intellectual property sold to Irdeto in The Netherlands.

See also
 Conditional access
 AlphaStar (satellite broadcasting service)
 EchoStar
 Satellite television

Satellite television
Television companies of the United States